Zygospermella is a genus of fungi within the Lasiosphaeriaceae family.

References

External links

Lasiosphaeriaceae